Gareth L. John Forwood (14 October 1945 – 16 October 2007) was a British stage, film and television actor. 

Forwood was born to actors Glynis Johns and Anthony Forwood. He made his screen debut in 1965 and went on to prosper as a character actor with over 40 credits in film, television and theatre. His career was marked with recurring roles in several large productions, particularly with the British public broadcast network ITV. In his later career, Forwood was typecast in several British television adaptations of classic novels.

Early life and education
Gareth Forwood was born on 14 October 1945 in Marylebone, London to British socialite actors Glynis Johns and Anthony Forwood, who became stars in the postwar era and divorced in 1948 when Forwood was three years old. The Forwood family were landed gentry; Forwood's patrilineal great-great-grandfather, Thomas Friend Brittain Peploe Forwood, resided in Thornton Manor in Cheshire and was the forefather of the Forwood Baronetcy. His matrilineal great-grandmother had inherited a production company from her father; on her side, Forwood became the fifth generation to act on stage.

When his father moved in with actor Sir Dirk Bogarde, Forwood went with him, living at the centuries-old Beel House in Amersham parish and also with his mother, who lived primarily in Britain for the next two decades. Forwood attended Ludgrove Preparatory School in Wokingham, where he was in the same year as Charles Wellesley, 9th Duke of Wellington. He was later enrolled at Stowe School in 1959, followed by Chilton Cantelo School, and Millfield School in Street.

Career

Early career
Though his mother attempted to dissuade him from the stage, Forwood would later make his stage debut on 22 December 1964 with her blessing, playing The Prince in Nicholas Stuart Gray's Beauty and the Beast at the Castle Theatre in Farnham; this production lasted little more than a month, closing on 23 January 1965. He followed this with later appearances at the Apollo Theatre in London as Charles Wykeham in Brandon Thomas' Charley's Aunt from 30 August 1971 to 13 February 1972, Bath's Theatre Royal and London's Cambridge Theatre in Marcelle Maurette's Anastasia in October 1976, and the Ashcroft Theatre in London as Jackie Jackson in a Cambridge Theatre Company production of Terence Rattigan's The Deep Blue Sea from 5 July 1977 to 30 July 1977.

Forwood made his professional television debut with the series of one-off plays The Wednesday Play in 1965, in which he appeared three separate times: as Balcar in 1965, Colin in 1966, and Cantfield in 1970. Forwood made a guest appearance in the sitcom The Golden Age in 1967 and made his cinematic debut in Jack Gold's The Bofors Gun the following year. He appeared in the anthology television series Detective (1968), the silent television comedy For Amusement Only (1968) and the anthology period piece The Jazz Age (1968), as John, Second Youth, and Tom Kent-Cumberland respectively. Forwood was given the minor role of Alistair in Guy Hamilton's 1969 war film Battle of Britain.

The same year, he was cast in two separate ITV athology series: ITV Playhouse and ITV Sunday Night Theatre. In Playhouse, Forwood played Martin Wyld in the episode Public Face (1969) and Carr in the episode Refuge for a Hero (1972); in Sunday Night Theatre, he played Steven Hindle in the episode The Innocent Ceremony (1969), Basil Anthony in the episode Man and Boy (1971), and Desmond in the episode The Piano Player (1972). In the intervening years, Forwood played Rex Gascoigne in Daniel Deronda (1970), Julian Webb in The Main Chance (1970), P.C. Mansell in Doctor at Large (1971), Brian Foxe in Eyeless in Gaza (1971), and Graham in Late Night Theatre (1972). In 1973, Forwood was cast as Doctor Park in ITV Granada's courtroom drama series Crown Court along with his grandfather, actor Mervyn Johns, who played Arthur Charles Parfitt and Edward Lumsden.

Later career
By the mid-1970s, Forwood was already an established character actor, with parts in such films as Where Adam Stood (1976) as Mr. Brackley, Birth of the Beatles (1979) as Alden, and Blade on the Feather (1980) as the Doctor. His television credits of this era include playing Everett Wharton on the 1974 BBC television adaptation of Anthony Trollope's eponymous novels The Pallisers, Jonathan Bridges on the nonlinear narrative series The ITV Play, and Doctor Crampton on the final season of ITV's drama series Armchair Thriller in 1980.

The following two decades saw Forwood take on more film roles. He was cast as the Photographer on Aquitania in Christopher Miles' 1981 biographical film Priest of Love, the Secretary in Richard Attenborough's 1982 period biographical film Gandhi, Duke in David S. Ward's 1991 comedy film King Ralph, Ian in Pradip Krishen's 1992 Indian film Electric Moon, and Denis Carradine in Sarah Pia Anderson's 1995 crime drama Prime Suspect: Inner Circles. Forwood's television roles, too, grew more numerous. He played Max in three episodes of ITV's Funny Man alongside Jimmy Jewel and David Schofield in 1981, Wyndham in one episode of the 1982 adaptation of Thomas Flanagan's eponymous novel The Year of the French, Professional Man in one episode of Roy Ward Baker's sitcom Fairly Secret Army starring Geoffrey Palmer in 1984, the Doctor in three episodes of Johnny Speight's BBC television sitcom In Sickness and in Health in 1987, Boris in one episode of Andrew Davies' adaptation of Domini Taylor's eponymous novel Mother Love, and the surgeon in one episode of Simon Langton's 1994 television mini-series adaptation of the eponymous 1978 novel The Cinder Path by Catherine Cookson.

In 1989, Forwood played Derek Preston in the episode Life and Death of Geoff McQueen's police procedural television series The Bill on ITV. Nine years later in 1998, he was recast in the same series, this time as Maurice Petrow in the episode Indiscretion. His final screen role was as Hilary Quentin in Rob Heyland's 2000 series Bomber. In later life, Forwood worked as a guest commentator for the BBC.

Personal life
Forwood's mother, Glynis Johns, married a further three times after divorcing his father. On 1 February 1952 in Manhattan, New York, she married David Ramsey Foster, a Royal Navy officer and later president of Colgate-Palmolive. They divorced on 17 May 1956. She married Cecil Peter Lamont Henderson, a businessman, on 10 October 1960 in Westminster, London; they divorced on 21 June 1962. Her fourth and final husband was writer Elliott Arnold, whom she married on 1 October 1964 in Los Angeles, California. They divorced on 4 January 1973.

In 1973, Forwood married French national Veronique Lecoq, with whom he had one son.

Forwood retired from acting in 2000. He was later diagnosed with cancer and, following a heart attack, passed away on 16 October 2007 at his home in London.

Filmography

Film

Television

Theatre

Ancestors

References

External links
 

1945 births
2007 deaths
Male actors from London
People from Marylebone
People educated at Ludgrove School
People educated at Stowe School
People educated at Chilton Cantelo School
People educated at Millfield
20th-century British male actors
British male film actors
British male television actors
British male stage actors
British commentators